Tom Cumming Carrell (July 10, 1900 – October 15, 1972) was an American politician.

Early life
Tom C. Carrell was born on July 10, 1900 in Cooper, Texas. He graduated from the University of California, Los Angeles (UCLA) and he received a master's degree in Education from the University of Southern California.

Career
During World War II, he served in the United States Army.

Carrell  as a Democratic member of the California State Assembly for the 41st district from 1959 to 1967, and the California State Senate for the 22nd district from 1967 to 1972. As state senator, he objected to Southern California Edison's chairman Jack K. Horton's plan to increase electricity rates by 16% in 1971.

Death
Carrell died on October 15, 1972 in Honolulu, Hawaii.

References

1900 births
1972 deaths
People from Cooper, Texas
University of California, Los Angeles alumni
USC Rossier School of Education alumni
United States Army personnel of World War II
Democratic Party members of the California State Assembly
Democratic Party California state senators
20th-century American politicians
Military personnel from Texas